Ironcollo (from Aymara Irun Qullu) is a small town in the department of Cochabamba, Bolivia.

See also 
 Tunari National Park

External links 
 Cochabamba Travel Guide
 Weather in Cochabamba

References

 www.ine.gov.bo

Populated places in Cochabamba Department